The following is an overview of events in 1980 in film, including the highest-grossing films, award ceremonies and festivals, a list of films released and notable deaths.

Highest-grossing films (U.S.)

The top ten 1980 released films by box office gross in North America are as follows:

Worldwide gross revenue
The following table lists known worldwide gross revenue figures for several high-grossing films that originally released in 1980. Note that this list is incomplete and is therefore not representative of the highest-grossing films worldwide in 1980.

Events 
 April 29 – Sir Alfred Hitchcock, known as "the Master of Suspense", dies at his home in Bel Air, California, at the age of 80.
 May 21 – The Empire Strikes Back is released and is the highest-grossing film of the year (just as its predecessor, Star Wars, was three years prior).
 June 9 – Richard Pryor sets himself on fire while free-basing cocaine and drinking 151-proof rum. Pryor ran down his street in Northridge, California, until subdued by police. 
 June 20 – The Blues Brothers is released, and in addition to becoming one of the top-grossing films of the year, it also became the first feature film to be based on characters created on Saturday Night Live.
 November 19 – Heaven's Gate becomes one of the biggest box office bombs of all-time and its colossal failure bankrupts United Artists.
 Allied Artists is sold to Lorimar Productions.

Context
Industry professionals predicted comedy films and upbeat entertainment to dominate theaters in 1980. This was a response to poor morale in a nation suffering through economic recession, which generally increased theatrical visits as audiences sought escapism and ignored romantic films and depictions of blue-collar life. The financial success and low cost of production cost of comedies such as Blazing Saddles (1974) and Animal House (1978), had further driven demand for comedies; Airplane!, The Blues Brothers, Caddyshack, and The Jerk, were all scheduled for release that year. The average cost of making films had risen to $6million which had reduced the number of films being made for niche audiences. Some studios continued to release a wide variety of films, hoping that few significant successes would compensate for other failures.

A surge of interest in science-fiction following Star Wars release had led to many low-budget entries in the genre attempting to profit by association, and big budget entries such as Star Trek: The Motion Picture and The Black Hole, both of which were released in late 1979, just months before The Empire Strikes Back.

Awards 

Palme d'Or (Cannes Film Festival):
All That Jazz, directed by Bob Fosse, United States
Kagemusha, 影武者 (Shadow Warrior), directed by Akira Kurosawa, Japan

Golden Lion (Venice Film Festival):
Atlantic City, directed by Louis Malle, US / Canada / France
Gloria, directed by John Cassavetes, United States

Golden Bear (Berlin Film Festival):
Heartland, directed by Richard Pearce, United States
Palermo or Wolfsburg (Palermo oder Wolfsburg), directed by Werner Schroeter, West Germany

Notable films released in 1980 
United States unless stated

#

9 to 5, directed by Colin Higgins, starring Jane Fonda, Lily Tomlin, Dolly Parton, Dabney Coleman

A
The Agency, starring Robert Mitchum, Lee Majors, Valerie Perrine – (Canada)
Airplane!, starring Robert Hays, Julie Hagerty, Leslie Nielsen, Peter Graves, Lloyd Bridges, Robert Stack, Kareem Abdul-Jabbar
Alien Dead, directed by Fred Olen Ray, starring Buster Crabbe
Alligator, directed by Lewis Teague, starring Robert Forster, Robin Riker, and Michael Gazzo
Altered States, directed by Ken Russell, starring William Hurt and Blair Brown
American Gigolo, directed by Paul Schrader, starring Richard Gere, Lauren Hutton and Héctor Elizondo
Antropophagus, directed by Joe D'Amato, starring George Eastman, Tisa Farrow, Zora Kerova, Saverio Vallone, and Serena Grandi (Italy)
Any Which Way You Can, directed by Buddy Van Horn, starring Clint Eastwood, Geoffrey Lewis, William Smith, Barry Corbin, Ruth Gordon
Arrebato (Rapture), directed by Ivan Zulueta, starring Eusebio Poncela, and Cecilia Roth (Spain)
Atlantic City (Released in the U.S. in 1981), directed by Louis Malle, starring Burt Lancaster and Susan Sarandon – (Canada/France) – Golden Lion winner
The Awakening, starring Charlton Heston, Susannah York and Stephanie Zimbalist – (U.K.)

B
Babylon, starring Brinsley Forde – (U.K.)
A Bad Son (un mauvais fils), directed by Claude Sautet – (France)
Bad Timing, directed by Nicolas Roeg, starring Art Garfunkel, Theresa Russell, Denholm Elliott, Harvey Keitel – (U.K.)
The Baltimore Bullet, starring James Coburn
Berlin Alexanderplatz, a TV mini-series directed by Rainer Werner Fassbinder, starring Gunther Lamprecht, Hanna Schygulla, Barbara Sukowa – (West Germany)
The Big Brawl, starring Jackie Chan – (Hong Kong/United States)
The Big Red One, directed by Samuel Fuller, starring Lee Marvin, Mark Hamill, Robert Carradine
Bizalom (Confidence), directed by István Szabó – (Hungary)
The Black Marble, directed by Harold Becker, starring Robert Foxworth, Paula Prentiss, Harry Dean Stanton
The Blood of Hussain, directed by Jamil Dehlavi – (Pakistan)
The Blue Lagoon, starring Brooke Shields and Christopher Atkins
The Blues Brothers, directed by John Landis, starring John Belushi, Dan Aykroyd, Cab Calloway, Carrie Fisher, John Candy, Henry Gibson
Bon Voyage, Charlie Brown (and Don't Come Back!!)
Borderline, directed by Jerrold Freedman, starring Charles Bronson, Wilford Brimley, Bruno Kirby, Ed Harris, Kenneth McMillan, John Ashton
Breaker Morant, directed by Bruce Beresford, starring Edward Woodward – (Australia)
Bronco Billy, directed by and starring Clint Eastwood, with Sondra Locke, Geoffrey Lewis, Sam Bottoms, Scatman Crothers
Brubaker, directed by Stuart Rosenberg, starring Robert Redford, David Keith, Jane Alexander, Yaphet Kotto

C
Caboblanco, directed by J. Lee Thompson, starring Charles Bronson, Jason Robards, Dominique Sanda
Caddyshack, directed by Harold Ramis, starring Chevy Chase, Rodney Dangerfield, Ted Knight, Michael O'Keefe, Cindy Morgan, Bill Murray
The Candidate (Der Kandidat), directed by Volker Schlöndorff – (West Germany)
Cannibal Holocaust, directed by Ruggero Deodato, starring Robert Kerman – (Italy)
Can't Stop the Music, directed by Nancy Walker, starring Valerie Perrine, Caitlyn Jenner, Steve Guttenberg, Village People
Carny, starring Jodie Foster, Gary Busey and Robbie Robertson
Chann Pardesi, starring Kulbhushan Kharbanda and Om Puri – (India)
A Change of Seasons, starring Shirley MacLaine, Anthony Hopkins, Bo Derek
The Changeling, starring George C. Scott – (Canada)
Cheech & Chong's Next Movie
Children's Island (Barnens ö) – (Sweden)
La Cicala (The Cicada), starring Anthony Franciosa and Virna Lisi – (Italy)
City of Women (La città delle donne), directed by Federico Fellini, starring Marcello Mastroianni – (Italy)
The Club, starring Jack Thompson – (Australia)
Coal Miner's Daughter, starring Sissy Spacek and Tommy Lee Jones
The Competition, starring Richard Dreyfuss, Amy Irving, Lee Remick, Sam Wanamaker
The Constant Factor (Constans) – (Poland)
The Crime of Cuenca (El crimen de Cuenca) – (Spain)
Cruising, directed by William Friedkin, starring Al Pacino
Cutting It Short (Postřižiny), directed by Jiří Menzel – (Czechoslovakia)

D
Dadar Kirti (Deeds of My Elder Brother) – (India)
Death Watch (La Mort en direct), directed by Bertrand Tavernier, starring Romy Schneider and Harvey Keitel – (France)
Delusion directed by Alan Beattie, starring Patricia Pearcy and Joseph Cotten
Die Laughing, starring Robby Benson and Bud Cort
Dinosaurs, directed by Will Vinton 
The Dogs of War, starring Christopher Walken – (US/UK)
Dostana (Friendship), starring Amitabh Bachchan – (India)
Dressed to Kill, directed by Brian De Palma, starring Michael Caine, Nancy Allen, Keith Gordon, Angie Dickinson

E
Elisita – (Spain)
The Elephant Man, directed by David Lynch, starring John Hurt and Anthony Hopkins – (US/UK)
The Empire Strikes Back, directed by Irvin Kershner, starring Harrison Ford, Mark Hamill, Carrie Fisher, Billy Dee Williams
Encounters of the Spooky Kind (Gui da gui), directed by and starring Sammo Hung – (Hong Kong)
Every Man for Himself (Sauve qui peut (la vie)), directed by Jean-Luc Godard, starring Jacques Dutronc and Isabelle Huppert – (France)
The Exterminator, starring Robert Ginty and Samantha Eggar

F
Fade to Black, starring Dennis Christopher
The Falls, directed by Peter Greenaway – (U.K.)
Fame, directed by Alan Parker, starring Irene Cara
Fatso, directed by and starring Anne Bancroft, with Dom DeLuise
The Final Countdown, starring Kirk Douglas, Katharine Ross, Martin Sheen
The First Deadly Sin, starring Frank Sinatra, David Dukes, Martin Gabel, Brenda Vaccaro, Faye Dunaway
First Family, directed by Buck Henry, starring Bob Newhart, Madeline Kahn, Gilda Radner
Flash Gordon, directed by Mike Hodges, starring Sam J. Jones, Melody Anderson, Chaim Topol – (US/UK)
The Fog, directed by John Carpenter, starring Adrienne Barbeau and Jamie Lee Curtis
Foolin' Around, starring Gary Busey, Annette O'Toole, Eddie Albert, Cloris Leachman
The Formula, starring George C. Scott and Marlon Brando
Foxes, directed by Adrian Lyne, starring Jodie Foster, Cherie Currie, Scott Baio and Adam Faith
Friday the 13th, directed by Sean S. Cunningham, starring Betsy Palmer, Adrienne King and Harry Crosby

G
The Gamekeeper, directed by Ken Loach – (U.K.)
Gamera: Super Monster (Uchu Kaijū Gamera) – (Japan)
Germany, Pale Mother (Deutschland bleiche Mutter), starring Eva Mattes – (West Germany)
Gilda Live, starring Gilda Radner, Father Guido Sarducci
Gloria, directed by John Cassavetes, starring Gena Rowlands – Golden Lion winner
The Gods Must Be Crazy, directed by Jamie Uys, starring N!xau, Sandra Prinsloo and Marius Weyers – (South Africa)
Good Riddance (Les Bons débarras) – (Canada)
The Great Rock 'n' Roll Swindle, a mockumentary directed by Julien Temple, featuring The Sex Pistols and Malcolm McLaren – (U.K.)

H
Hangar 18, starring Darren McGavin and Robert Vaughn
Health, a.k.a. H.E.A.L.T.H., directed by Robert Altman, starring Carol Burnett, Lauren Bacall, Glenda Jackson, James Garner
Heart Beat, starring Nick Nolte, Sissy Spacek, John Heard
He Knows You're Alone, starring Don Scardino and Caitlin O'Heaney
Heaven's Gate, directed by Michael Cimino, starring Kris Kristofferson, Christopher Walken, Isabelle Huppert, John Hurt, Sam Waterston, Jeff Bridges
Herbie Goes Bananas, directed by Vincent McEveety, starring Cloris Leachman, Harvey Korman and Charles Martin Smith
Hero at Large, starring John Ritter and Anne Archer
Hey Babe!, starring Yasmine Bleeth and Buddy Hackett – (Canada)
Hirak Rajar Deshe (Kingdom of Diamonds), directed by Satyajit Ray – (India)
The Hit (Trhák) – (Czechoslovakia)
Home Movies, directed by Brian De Palma, starring Kirk Douglas, Vincent Gardenia, Gerrit Graham, Nancy Allen
Hopscotch, directed by Ronald Neame, starring Walter Matthau and Glenda Jackson
How to Beat the High Cost of Living, starring Susan Saint James, Jessica Lange, Jane Curtin, Dabney Coleman, Richard Benjamin
Humanoids from the Deep, starring Vic Morrow, Doug McClure, Ann Turkel
The Hunter, starring Steve McQueen (in his final film), Kathryn Harrold, LeVar Burton, Ben Johnson, Eli Wallach

I
The Idolmaker, directed by Taylor Hackford, starring Ray Sharkey and Peter Gallagher
Inferno, directed by Dario Argento – (Italy)
Inside Moves, directed by Richard Donner, starring John Savage, David Morse, Diana Scarwid
The Island, directed by Michael Ritchie, starring Michael Caine
It's My Turn, directed by Claudia Weill, starring Jill Clayburgh, Michael Douglas, Charles Grodin

J
The Jazz Singer, starring Neil Diamond, Lucie Arnaz, Laurence Olivier
Just Tell Me What You Want, directed by Sidney Lumet, starring Ali MacGraw, Alan King, Peter Weller, Myrna Loy

K
Karz (In Debt), starring Rishi Kapoor – (India)
Kagemusha, directed by Akira Kurosawa, starring Tatsuya Nakadai, Tsutomu Yamazaki, Kenichi Hagiwara – (Japan) – Palme d'Or winner
Khubsoorat, starring Ashok Kumar and Rekha – (India)
Klondike Fever, starring Jeff East, Rod Steiger, Angie Dickinson, Gordon Pinsent – (Canada)

L
Ladies' Choice (Dami Kanyat), directed by Ivan Andonov, starring Stefan Danailov – (Bulgaria)
The Last Flight of Noah's Ark, starring Elliott Gould, Geneviève Bujold, Ricky Schroder
The Last Married Couple in America, starring Natalie Wood, George Segal, Valerie Harper, Richard Benjamin
The Last Metro (Le dernier metro), directed by François Truffaut, starring Catherine Deneuve and Gérard Depardieu – (France)
The Last Witness – (South Korea)
The Lathe of Heaven, starring Bruce Davison
Legend of Tianyun Mountain (Tiān yún shān chuán qí) – (China)
The Life and Times of Rosie the Riveter, a documentary film
Little Darlings, starring Tatum O'Neal, Kristy McNichol, Armand Assante and Matt Dillon
Little Miss Marker, starring Walter Matthau, Julie Andrews, Tony Curtis, Bob Newhart
The Long Good Friday, directed by John Mackenzie, starring Bob Hoskins and Helen Mirren – (U.K.)
The Long Riders, directed by Walter Hill, starring the Keach brothers, Carradine brothers and Quaid brothers
Loulou, starring Isabelle Huppert and Gérard Depardieu – (France)
Loving Couples, directed by Jack Smight, starring Shirley MacLaine, James Coburn, Stephen Collins, Susan Sarandon

M
 The Magician of Lublin, starring Alan Arkin, Valerie Perrine, Louise Fletcher
The Man with Bogart's Face, starring Robert Sacchi, Misty Rowe, Victor Buono, Yvonne De Carlo, Herbert Lom
Manila by Night – (Philippines)
McVicar, directed by Tom Clegg, starring Roger Daltrey, Adam Faith, Cheryl Campbell – (U.K.)
Melvin and Howard, directed by Jonathan Demme, starring Paul Le Mat, Jason Robards, Mary Steenburgen
Midnight Madness, directed by Michael Nankin and David Wechter, starring David Naughton, Debra Clinger, Stephen Furst, Eddie Deezen, Maggie Roswell, Brad Wilkin, Michael J. Fox, Alan Solomon
The Mirror Crack'd, directed by Guy Hamilton, starring Angela Lansbury, Elizabeth Taylor, Kim Novak, Tony Curtis, Rock Hudson – (U.K.)
Mon oncle d'Amérique, directed by Alain Resnais, starring Gérard Depardieu – (France) – Cannes Special Jury Prize
Motel Hell, starring Rory Calhoun
The Mountain Men, starring Charlton Heston and Brian Keith
My Bodyguard, directed by Tony Bill, starring Matt Dillon, Adam Baldwin, Chris Makepeace, Martin Mull

N
The Nest (El Nido) – (Spain)
Nightkill, starring Robert Mitchum
Nijinsky, starring George de la Peña and Alan Bates
The Ninth Configuration, directed by William Peter Blatty, starring Stacy Keach, Scott Wilson, Jason Miller

O
O Megalexandros (Alexander the Great), directed by Theodoros Angelopoulos – (Greece)
Oh, God! Book II, starring George Burns
One Trick Pony, written by and starring Paul Simon, with Blair Brown, Joan Hackett, Rip Torn
The Orchestra Conductor (Dyrygent), directed by Andrzej Wajda, starring John Gielgud – (Poland)
Ordinary People, directed by Robert Redford, starring Donald Sutherland, Mary Tyler Moore, Timothy Hutton, Judd Hirsch, Elizabeth McGovern
Out of the Blue, directed by and starring Dennis Hopper, with Linda Manz, Raymond Burr – (Canada)

P
Pepi, Luci, Bom, directed by Pedro Almodóvar – (Spain)
Palermo or Wolfsburg – (West Germany) – Golden Bear winner
Permanent Vacation, directed by Jim Jarmusch
The Pilot, directed by and starring Cliff Robertson, with Diane Baker and Gordon MacRae
Playing for Time, directed by Daniel Mann, starring Vanessa Redgrave and Jane Alexander
Popeye, directed by Robert Altman, starring Robin Williams and Shelley Duvall
The quality of Mkvmoviespoint movies 
Pray TV, starring Dabney Coleman
Private Benjamin, directed by Howard Zieff, starring Goldie Hawn, Eileen Brennan, Armand Assante, Robert Webber, Harry Dean Stanton
The Private Eyes, starring Tim Conway and Don Knotts
Prom Night, starring Leslie Nielsen and Jamie Lee Curtis

Q
Qurbani (Sacrifice), directed by and starring Feroz Khan – (India)

R
Raging Bull, directed by Martin Scorsese, starring Robert De Niro, Joe Pesci, Cathy Moriarty
Resurrection, starring Ellen Burstyn and Eva Le Gallienne
The Return of the King, animated film, voices of Orson Bean, John Huston, William Conrad
Return of the Secaucus 7, directed by John Sayles
El Retorno del Hombre Lobo (Return of the Werewolf) – (Spain)
Roadie, directed by Alan Rudolph, starring Meat Loaf and Kaki Hunter
Le Roi et l'oiseau (The King and the Mocking Bird), animated film – (France)
Rockshow, concert film featuring Paul McCartney and Wings – (U.K.)
Rough Cut, directed by Don Siegel, starring Burt Reynolds, Lesley-Anne Down, David Niven
Rude Boy, a rockumentary featuring The Clash – (U.K.)

S
Sällskapsresan (The Charter Trip), directed by and starring Lasse Åberg – (Sweden)
Saturn 3, directed by Stanley Donen, starring Farrah Fawcett, Kirk Douglas, Harvey Keitel
The Sea Wolves, starring Gregory Peck, David Niven, Roger Moore – (UK/US/Switzerland)
See You in the Next War (enja u sledećem ratu) – (Yugoslavia)
Seems Like Old Times, starring Goldie Hawn, Chevy Chase and Charles Grodin
Serial, starring Martin Mull, Tuesday Weld, Christopher Lee, Bill Macy, Sally Kellerman, Tom Smothers
The Shining, directed by Stanley Kubrick, starring Jack Nicholson, Shelley Duvall, Danny Lloyd, Scatman Crothers
Simon, starring Alan Arkin
A Small Circle of Friends, starring Brad Davis and Karen Allen
Smokey and the Bandit II, directed by Hal Needham, starring Burt Reynolds, Sally Field, Jackie Gleason, Jerry Reed and Dom DeLuise
Solo Sunny – (East Germany)
Somewhere in Time, starring Christopher Reeve and Jane Seymour
Special Treatment (Poseban tretman) – (Yugoslavia)
Stardust Memories, directed by and starring Woody Allen, with Charlotte Rampling and Jessica Harper
Stir Crazy, directed by Sidney Poitier, starring Richard Pryor and Gene Wilder
Stalker, directed by Andrei Tarkovsky and released in 1979 but later released in 1980 
The Stunt Man, directed by Richard Rush, starring Peter O'Toole, Barbara Hershey, Steve Railsback
Sunday Lovers, starring Gene Wilder, Roger Moore, Lino Ventura
Superman II, starring Christopher Reeve, Gene Hackman, Margot Kidder, Terence Stamp

T
Terror Train, starring Ben Johnson, Jamie Lee Curtis, Hart Bochner
La terrazza (The Terrace), starring Marcello Mastroianni, Vittorio Gassman, Ugo Tognazzi – (Italy)
That Sinking Feeling, directed by Bill Forsyth, starring John Gordon Sinclair – (U.K.)
Those Lips, Those Eyes, starring Frank Langella, Glynnis O'Connor, Tom Hulce
Times Square, directed by Allen Moyle, starring Robin Johnson, Trini Alvarado, Tim Curry
To Love the Damned (Maledetti vi amerò) – (Italy)
Tom Horn, starring Steve McQueen, Richard Farnsworth, Linda Evans
Tribute, starring Jack Lemmon – (Canada)
Twelve Months (Sekai Meisaku Douwa Mori wa Ikiteiru / Dvenadtsat mesyatsev) – (Japan/U.S.S.R.)

U
The Unseen, starring Barbara Bach and Stephen Furst
Up the Academy, directed by Robert Downey Sr.
Urban Cowboy, directed by James Bridges, starring John Travolta, Debra Winger, Scott Glenn, Madolyn Smith, Barry Corbin
Used Cars, directed by Robert Zemeckis, starring Kurt Russell, Deborah Harmon, Jack Warden, Gerrit Graham

V
Virus (Fukkatsu no hi), starring Sonny Chiba and Glenn Ford – (Japan)
Le Voyage en douce, starring Dominique Sanda and Geraldine Chaplin – (France)

W
Waiter, Scarper! (Vrchní, prchni!) – (Czechoslovakia)
The Watcher in the Woods, starring Bette Davis – (UK/US)
When Time Ran Out, starring Paul Newman, Jacqueline Bisset, William Holden, Burgess Meredith, Ernest Borgnine, Red Buttons
Where the Buffalo Roam, directed by Art Linson, starring Bill Murray and Peter Boyle
Wholly Moses!, starring Dudley Moore, Laraine Newman, Paul Sand, Dom DeLuise
Who's Singin' Over There? (Ko to tamo peva) – (Yugoslavia)
Why Would I Lie?, starring Treat Williams, Lisa Eichhorn, Valerie Curtin
Willie & Phil, directed by Paul Mazursky, starring Margot Kidder, Ray Sharkey, Michael Ontkean
Windows, starring Talia Shire and Elizabeth Ashley
Witches' Brew, starring Teri Garr and Richard Benjamin

X
Xanadu, starring Olivia Newton-John, Michael Beck, Gene Kelly

Y
The Young Master (Shi di chu ma), directed by and starring Jackie Chan – (Hong Kong)
Yūgure made – (Japan)

Z
Zigeunerweisen (Gypsy Airs), directed by Seijun Suzuki – (Japan)

1980 Wide-release movies
United States unless stated

January–March

April–June

July–September

October–December

Births
January 2 - David Gyasi, British actor
January 4 - Greg Cipes, voice actor
January 7
Hele Kõrve, Estonian actress and singer
Simon Woods, English actor and writer
January 8
Rachel Nichols (actress), American actress and model
Sam Riley, English actor and singer 
January 10
Katie Dippold, American actress, writer and screenwriter
Sarah Shahi, American actress and former model
January 16 – Lin-Manuel Miranda, American singer-songwriter and actor
January 17 – Zooey Deschanel, American singer-songwriter and actress
January 18
Estelle, British singer, songwriter, record producer and actress
Jason Segel, American actor, comedian, screenwriter, singer, songwriter, author and producer
January 21
Nana Mizuki, Japanese singer and voice actress
Kim Sharma, Indian actress
January 29 - Jason James Richter, American actor and musician
January 30 – Wilmer Valderrama, American actor
February 2 – Zhang Jingchu, Chinese actress
February 3 - Ben Turner (actor), British-Iranian actor
February 8
William Jackson Harper, American actor
Sinead Matthews, English actress
February 11 – Matthew Lawrence, American actor
February 12 – Christina Ricci, American actress
February 14 – Michelle Ye, Hong Kong actress and producer
February 17 - Jason Ritter, American actor, voice actor and producer
February 21 - Brendan Sexton III, American actor
February 25
Chris Knowings, American actor
Christy Knowings, American actress and comedian
February 29 - Steven Cree, Scottish actor
March 2 - Rebel Wilson, Australian actress, comedian, writer and producer
March 3
Meiling Melançon, American actress and screenwriter
Katherine Waterston, American actress
March 7
 Laura Prepon, American actress
 Mart Toome, Estonian actor 
March 9 – Matthew Gray Gubler, American actor  
March 23 - Itay Tiran, Israeli actor and director
March 25 - Tinsel Korey, Canadian actress and singer-songwriter
March 31
Kate Micucci, American actress
Maaya Sakamoto, Japanese singer and voice actress
April 8 – Carrie Savage, American voice actress
April 11 - Julia Chantrey, Canadian actress
April 13
 Colleen Clinkenbeard, American voice actress
 Kelli Giddish, American actress
April 14 - Tom Franco, American actor
April 15 - Arian Moayed, Iranian-born American actor, writer and director
April 17
Nicholas D'Agosto, American actor
Samantha Soule, American actress
April 25 - Daniel MacPherson, Australian actor and television presenter
April 26
 Jordana Brewster, American actress
 Channing Tatum, American actor
April 29 - Damien Dante Wayans, American actor, screenwriter, producer and director
May 2 - Ellie Kemper, American actress and comedian
May 8
 Jasen Fisher, American former child actor
 Kimberlee Peterson, American actress
May 22
Nazanin Boniadi, British actress
Lucy Gordon (actress), English actress and model (died 2009)
Evelin Võigemast, Estonian actress
May 23 - D. J. Cotrona, American actor
May 25 - Will Janowitz, American actor
May 27 - Ben Feldman, American actor and producer.
June 10 - Jessica DiCicco, American film, television and voice actress
June 15 - Candace Brown, American actress and comedian
June 16 – Sibel Kekilli, German actress
June 19 - Neil Brown Jr., American actor
June 20 - Tika Sumpter, American actress, singer, producer, television host and model
June 21 - Preeya Kalidas, British singer and actress
June 23
Heath Freeman, American actor (died 2021)
Melissa Rauch, American actress and comedian
June 24 – Minka Kelly, American actress
June 26 - Jason Schwartzman, American actor, producer and musician
July 3 – Olivia Munn, American actress
July 4 - Max Elliott Slade, American former child actor
July 6 – Eva Green, French actress
July 10
James Rolfe, American filmmaker, actor, YouTuber and online personality
Jessica Simpson, American singer and actress
July 15 – Jasper Pääkkönen, Finnish actor and film producer
July 17 – Brett Goldstein, British actor and comedian
July 18 – Kristen Bell, American actress
July 19 - Mark Webber (actor), American actor, screenwriter and director
July 27 - Ewen Leslie, Australian actor
August 3 – Teuku Rifnu Wikana, Indonesian actor
August 5 - Sophie Winkleman, English actress
August 6 - Monique Ganderton, Canadian stunt performer and actress
August 8 – Marisa Quintanilla, American actress
August 10 – Pua Magasiva, New Zealand actor (died 2019)
August 12 - Dominique Swain, American actress and producer
August 13 - Álex González (actor), Spanish actor
August 15 - Natalie Press, English actress
August 18 – Preeti Jhangiani, Indian actress
August 19 - Adam Campbell (actor), English actor
August 21 - John Brotherton, American actor
August 25 – Jackie Tohn, American actress and singer
August 26
Macaulay Culkin, American actor
Chris Pine, American actor
August 31 - Leo Bill, English actor
September 7 - J. D. Pardo, American actor
September 9 – Michelle Williams, American actress
September 12 - Hiroyuki Sawano, Japanese music composer
September 13 – Ben Savage, American actor
September 13 – Cristiana Capotondi, Italian actress
September 19 - Benjamin Davies (actor), Scottish actor
September 21 – Kareena Kapoor, Indian actress
September 25 - T.I., American actor and rapper
September 29 - Zachary Levi, American actor and singer
September 30 - Toni Trucks, American actress
October 3 - Daniel DeSanto, Canadian actor and voice actor
October 4 - Nick Mohammed, English actor, comedian and writer
October 6 - David Alpay, Canadian actor, musician and producer
October 8
Nick Cannon, American comedian, rapper and television host
Nathan Head, British actor
October 14 – Ben Whishaw, English actor
October 18
Erin Dean, American former actress
Natasha Rothwell, American writer, actress and comedian
October 19 – Benjamin Salisbury, American actor
October 21 - Kim Kardashian, American media personality, model and actress
October 23 - Robert Belushi, American actor
October 24 – Monica, American singer-songwriter, producer and actress
October 28 - Wes Ball, American film director and artist
October 29 – Ben Foster, American actor
November 1 - Dani Rovira, Spanish comedian and actor
November 2 - Kim So-yeon, South Korean actress
November 5 - Luke Hemsworth, Australian actor
November 9 - Vanessa Lachey, American actress, fashion model and television host
November 12 – Ryan Gosling, Canadian actor
November 13 - Monique Coleman, American actress
November 18 - Mathew Baynton, English actor, writer, comedian, singer and musician
November 29 - Jason Griffith, American actor and voice actor
December 3
Anna Chlumsky, American actress
Jenna Dewan, American actress and dancer
December 9 – Simon Helberg, American actor and comedian
December 13 - Satoshi Tsumabuki, Japanese actor
December 16 - Michael Jibson, English actor, director, writer and voice over artist
December 18
Christina Aguilera, American singer, songwriter, actress and television personality
Neil Fingleton, English actor (died 2017)
December 19
Jake Gyllenhaal, American actor
Marla Sokoloff, American actress
December 27 - Elizabeth Rodriguez, American actress
December 30 – Eliza Dushku, American actress

Deaths

Film debuts 
Christopher Atkins – The Blue Lagoon
Michael Badalucco – Raging Bull
Adam Baldwin – My Bodyguard
Drew Barrymore – Altered States
Jennifer Beals – My Bodyguard
Pierce Brosnan – The Long Good Friday
Jim Carter – Flash Gordon
Robbie Coltrane – Death Watch
Barry Corbin – Urban Cowboy
Tony Cox – Dr. Heckyl and Mr. Hype
Peter Coyote – Die Laughing
Joan Cusack – Cutting Loose
Willem Dafoe – Heaven's Gate
John Diehl – Falling in Love Again
Billy Drago – Windwalker
Frankie Faison – Permanent Vacation
Miriam Flynn – First Family
Michael J. Fox – Midnight Madness
Peter Gallagher – The Idolmaker
Michael Gross – Just Tell Me What You Want
Julie Hagerty – Airplane!
Tom Hanks – He Knows You're Alone
Robert Hays – Airplane!
Linda Hunt – Popeye
William Hurt – Altered States
Jeremy Irons – Nijinsky
Gregory Itzin – Airplane!
O-Lan Jones – Die Laughing
Juliette Lewis – Bronco Billy
William H. Macy – Somewhere in Time
Ann Magnuson – The Long Island Four
Michael Maloney – Richard's Things
Sophie Marceau – La Boum
Christopher McDonald – The Hearse
Elizabeth McGovern – Ordinary People
Cathy Moriarty – Raging Bull
David Morse – Inside Moves
Cynthia Nixon – Little Darlings
Catherine O'Hara – Nothing Personal
Ed O'Neill – Cruising
Terry O'Quinn – Heaven's Gate
Michelle Pfeiffer – The Hollywood Knights
Richard Portnow – Roadie
Harold Ramis  – Caddyshack (director)
Judge Reinhold – Running Scared
Paul Reubens – Pray TV
John Rothman – Stardust Memories
Armin Shimerman – Stardust Memories
Jean Smart – Hoodlums
Kurtwood Smith – Roadie
Sharon Stone – Stardust Memories
David Strathairn – Return of the Secaucus 7
John Turturro – Raging Bull
Gedde Watanabe – The Long Island Four
Dianne Wiest – It's My Turn
Bruce Willis – The First Deadly Sin
Mare Winningham – One-Trick Pony
John Witherspoon – The Jazz Singer
Nicholas Woodeson – Heaven's Gate
Sean Young – Jane Austen in Manhattan
Lenore Zann – Hounds of Notre Dame

See also
 List of American films of 1980
 List of British films of 1980
 List of French films of 1980
 List of German films of the 1980s
 List of Bollywood films of 1980
 List of Italian films of 1980
 List of Japanese films of 1980
 List of Swedish films of the 1980s

Notes

References 

 
Film by year